Bradley Moni Mika (born 2 June 1981) is a New Zealand rugby union player. His position is lock. He was educated at St Peter's College. He made his provincial debut for Auckland in 2000, his Super Rugby debut for Crusaders in 2002, and his international debut in the same year.

In 2007, after stints with the Crusaders, Blues and Hurricanes, he headed overseas, playing in France and Japan. In 2011 he re-signed with the Blues. Mika played three tests for the All Blacks in 2002. He made his debut against England and played his last test against Wales. His career ended in 2012 when he had his fifth knee surgery, but was considered far too young for knee reconstructions. He was Malaysian Rugby National head Coach from 2015-2021. Won the Asian first Division 2016 & 2017. 

In 2021/22, he returned to NZ to complete season 2 of Match Fit. On episode 1, he didn't participate in the Bronco Test, a 1km agility and endurance test with 30 changes of directions at the 22m, 50m and full length of field, due to knee issues and lack of mobility to squat. On episode 2, however, he won the lineout throw simulation as a hooker, beating Corey Flynn. He then sat himself out against East Coast, again due to arthritis on his knees.

References

External links 

1981 births
New Zealand international rugby union players
Living people
Auckland rugby union players
New Zealand rugby union players
Rugby union locks
CA Brive players
New Zealand expatriate sportspeople in France
Expatriate rugby union players in France
People educated at St Peter's College, Auckland
Blues (Super Rugby) players
Crusaders (rugby union) players
Hurricanes (rugby union) players
New Zealand expatriate rugby union players
Expatriate rugby union players in Japan
New Zealand expatriate sportspeople in Japan
Urayasu D-Rocks players
Rugby union players from Auckland